The Qingdao–Lanzhou Expressway, designated as G22 and commonly referred to as the Qinglan Expressway is an expressway that connects the cities of Qingdao, Shandong, China, and Lanzhou, Gansu.

This expressway is sometimes called QingHong expressway (an example can be seen on a building at Handan North exit saying "QingHong expressway administration committee"). Some sources claim the "Hong" is referring to Khunjerab Pass (Hóngqílāfǔ shānkŏu), although the route west of Lanzhou is unknown.

The route of G22 between S2201 Handan Ring Expressway and Liaocheng is not clear. The northern route via Guantao County is marked G22 west of Shandong Provincial Highway 260 (in Guanxian) and Shandong Provicinal Expressway S1 (Jinan-Liaocheng) east of this point. The southern route via Daming County is marked G22 east of Shandong Provincial Highway 324 (in Dong'e) and Handan-Daming Expressway (without numbering) west of this point. Thus the sections marked G22 is not connected with each other even if there are two continuous expressways between Handan and Liaocheng.

References

Chinese national-level expressways
Expressways in Shandong
Expressways in Hebei
Expressways in Shanxi
Expressways in Shaanxi
Expressways in Gansu
Expressways in Ningxia